Zaraysky (masculine), Zarayskaya (feminine), or Zarayskoye (neuter) is the name of several rural localities in Russia:
Zaraysky (rural locality), a settlement in Karinskoye Rural Settlement of Zaraysky District of Moscow Oblast
Zarayskoye, Ivanovo Oblast, a selo in Puchezhsky District of Ivanovo Oblast
Zarayskoye, Tver Oblast, a khutor in Maksatikhinsky District of Tver Oblast